Afognak can refer to:

Afognak, an island in the U.S. state of Alaska
Afognak, Alaska, the former village located on the island of Afognak
Native Village of Afognak, the federally recognized tribe of Alutiiqs descended from the inhabitants of the island